Cady Run is a stream in the U.S. state of Ohio. It is a tributary to Archers Fork.

Cady Run was named after James Cady, a pioneer settler.

References

Rivers of Ohio
Rivers of Washington County, Ohio